The Umbani is a precision-guided bomb kit manufactured by Denel Dynamics in South Africa. It consists of a number of modules fitted to NATO standard Mk81, Mk82 or Mk83 low drag free-fall bombs to convert them into guided glide bombs.

Design
The modular kit consists of a number units that are attached to a standard Mk80-series bomb.

Range using different configurations:
 Standard bomb kit - 40 km
 With folding wing kit - 120 km
 With wing kit and Extended Range (ER) module - 200 km

Guidance
The weapon's all-weather, day and night capability is due to the GPS–INS guidance system. Increasing accuracy to a claimed 3m CEP is possible by adding an imaging infrared or a semi-active laser seeker terminal guidance system.

Testing and qualification
The system was first tested on the Atlas Cheetah, later an Aerosud-owned former South African Air Force (SAAF) Dassault Mirage F1 was used after the Cheetah retired. The system has been integrated on the SAAF's BAE Hawk Mk120 lead-in fighter trainer aircraft. Qualification on the SAAF's Saab JAS 39 Gripen was not considered due to the high costs associated with integration on a supersonic aircraft. The Gripens have been armed with GBU-12 Paveway II bombs instead.

Sales
The manufacturer has expressed optimism at the export potential of the system following qualification on the Hawk as a number of air forces worldwide operate Hawks.

An unnamed country has placed an order worth ZAR1.2 billion for the weapon. Although the SAAF has funded most of the development costs of the weapon system it has not yet placed a firm order for any.

Tawazun Dynamics, the joint venture company created by Denel and Tawazun, has been awarded a US$492.74 million contract from the United Arab Emirates Air Force for precision guided munitions (PGMs) for its Mirage 2000-9 fighters. The fighter jets will receive the Tawazun Dynamics developed Al Tariq bomb guidance kit which is the renamed Denel Dynamics Umbani.

Joint venture
On 20 September 2012 at the Africa Aerospace and Defence 2012 show in Pretoria, South Africa, Denel Dynamics announced a joint venture with Tawazun Holdings of the United Arab Emirates to develop and manufacture various precision weapons. A version of the Umbani known as the "Al-Tariq" will be the first product of the new Tawazun Dynamics company.

References

Post–Cold War weapons of South Africa
Guided bombs
Denel